Leslie Nipkow is an American essayist, television writer, playwright, and actress.

Positions held
Guarding Erica
performer/playwright (published in Vintage Books anthology: Talk to Me: Monologue Plays)

As the World Turns (hired by Jean Passanante)
Script Writer: September 4, 2007 - January 24, 2008; April 18, 2008 - July 31, 2008; November 13, 2008 - January 7, 2009; July 24, 2009 - September 17, 2010, end of series

One Life to Live (hired by Gary Tomlin)
 Script Writer: 2000 - September 19, 2005
 Occasional Script Writer: September 20, 2005 - August 17, 2007
 Script Editor: September 20, 2005 - October 3, 2007

Awards and nominations
Daytime Emmy Award
Winner, 2008, Best Writing, One Life to Live
Nomination, 2011, Best Writing, As the World Turns
Nomination, 2010, Best Writing, As the World Turns
Nomination, 2006, Best Writing, One Life to Live
Nomination, 2002, Best Writing, One Life to Live

Writers Guild of America Award
Winner, 2011, Best Writing, As the World Turns
Winner, 2009, Best Writing, As the World Turns
Nomination, 2010, Best Writing, As the World Turns
Nomination, 2005, Best Writing, One Life to Live
Nomination, 2003, Best Writing, One Life to Live

External links
"How to Kiss Like a Movie Star"
"Reading Lolita in Hell's Kitchen" from Connotation Press
"This is Why I'm Fat" from Salon.com
"Summer Book Festivals" from O: the Oprah Magazine
"Looking Up" on Mr. Beller's Neighborhood
"Mantooth" on FreshYarn.com
"A Long Day's Journey into Lip Gloss" at New York Times
"If Breast Cancer Knocked You Down, Could You get Back Up? from Prevention
"Best Places to Learn to Sew in NYC" on Citypath.com
"New York's Coolest Kids Craft Classes" on Citypath.com
Leslie Nipkow's Blog: Yogini Bikini
"Egghead's Delight" in WGAE Awards Journal 2010, page 13
"Misreading the Signs" in the New York Post
"Friend is a Verb" on Ducts.org

CenCom
FilmThreat
NYTimes

Living people
American soap opera writers
Writers Guild of America Award winners
Year of birth missing (living people)